Moon Seung-woo (born December 3, 2002) is a South Korean swimmer.

Career
In July 2021, he represented South Korea at the 2020 Summer Olympics held in Tokyo, Japan. He competed in 100m butterfly and 200m butterfly events. In both events, he did not advance to compete in the semifinal.

References

External links
 
 

2002 births
Living people
South Korean male butterfly swimmers
Swimmers from Seoul
Swimmers at the 2020 Summer Olympics
Olympic swimmers of South Korea
21st-century South Korean people